Joey Heindle (born 14 May 1993 in Munich) is a German singer. He is best known for winning the seventh season of the game show Ich bin ein Star – Holt mich hier raus! (2013) and finishing in 5th place in season 9 of Deutschland sucht den Superstar (2012), despite universally negative reviews from the jury each week.

Biography

Early life

Joey Heindle was born on 14 May 1993 in Munich, Bavaria.  He currently lives in Freising, Bavaria. He has 5 siblings. He has trained as an assistant chef and has further training as a chef. He had to cancel training due to a hand injury. He can play the guitar. He has sung at birthday parties. His favourite singers are Elton John and Xavier Naidoo.

DSDS

He went shirtless for his Top 8 performance. He felt uncomfortable going shirtless. Joey stated (about being shirtless) "Actually, I did not want that, but did that because the director wanted." Joey called DSDS jury member Dieter Bohlen a "pussy" for the negative criticism he has given him. After the show, Joey stated "Dieter was a pussy. He just left and did not listen till the end. That just simply sucks. No one on earth would do that in a talent show. This is a huge insult". Joey also stated that his relationship in the long-term won't suffer because of this and he will forgive Dieter at some point. He was eliminated in the Top 5. Though he received negative feedback in the mottoshows, he ranked high in the public voting until his elimination.

Performances

Post-DSDS

Within days of being eliminated from DSDS, Heindle got a recording contract with music producer Marco Delgardo. Heindle had to be taken to a hospital by ambulance after funny movement and falling on his bed. He was diagnosed with a pinched nerve. Heindle is booked until August 2013. Heindle participated in Ich bin ein Star – Holt mich hier raus! and won.

Discography

Studio albums

Singles

References

1993 births
Living people
Musicians from Munich
Deutschland sucht den Superstar participants
Ich bin ein Star – Holt mich hier raus! winners
21st-century German male singers